The Monument to Admiral Barroso is an artistic work by Brazilian sculptor  made in 1909, which honors admiral Francisco Manuel Barroso, the Baron of Amazonas, and his subordinates who died in the Battle of Riachuelo. The statue was built in bronze; it is supported by a masonry support lined with white granite that has inscribed the names of the main vessels involved in the battle and images of officers who died in it.

References

Citations

Bibliography 
 

Monuments and memorials in Rio de Janeiro (city)
Cenotaphs